Joel T. Johnson (born July 9, 1936) was a Nebraska state senator from Kearney, Nebraska, in the Nebraska Legislature and a retired general surgeon. 

Personal life
He was born on July 9, 1936, in St. Paul, Minnesota and graduated from Axtell High School in 1954, the University of Nebraska-Lincoln in 1958, and the University of Nebraska Medical Center in 1961 with an M.D. From 1966 to 1968 he was in the U.S. Navy. He is currently a member of the American College of Surgeons, American Medical Association, and First Lutheran Church of Kearney and a former member of the Kearney Area Chamber of Commerce.

State legislature
He was appointed to the Nebraska legislature by Governor Mike Johanns on July 1, 2002, to replace Doug Kristensen who had resigned. He was then elected in 2002 to represent the 37th Nebraska legislative district and reelected in 2004. He sat on the Banking, Commerce and Insurance, and Health and Human Services committees.

References
 

Nebraska state senators
University of Nebraska–Lincoln alumni
American Lutherans
1936 births
Living people
People from Kearney, Nebraska
People from Saint Paul, Minnesota